3,4-Dihydroxyphenylacetaldehyde (DOPAL) is an important metabolite of the major brain neurotransmitter dopamine.  All of the enzymatic metabolism of dopamine in neurons passes through DOPAL. According to the "catecholaldehyde hypothesis," DOPAL plays a role in the pathogenesis of Parkinson's disease.  DOPAL has been chemically synthesized. DOPAL is detoxified mainly by aldehyde dehydrogenase. DOPAL is a metabolite of dopamine by monoamine oxidase activity, or MAO, in differentiated neuronal cells of the PC12 line. Physiological concentrations of DOPAL in isolated mitochondria were highly potent in inducing a pathway associated with programmed cell death (or apoptosis), permeability transition. This suggests the cytotoxity of DOPAL and its role in the progression of Parkinson's disease, which has long been associated with mitochondrial abnormalities and neurotoxicity by way of dopaminergic compounds, while reducing the emphasis on other dopamine derivatives and metabolites.

References 

Phenolic human metabolites
Aldehydes
Catechols